Bertha Louise Chapman Cady (1873–1956) was an American entomologist and educator.

Life 
Born Bertha Louise Chapman, she received a Bachelor of Arts in 1895 and a Master of Arts in 1902 from Stanford University. She taught high school biology from 1900 to 1907. From 1907 to 1909, she was an assistant in nature study at the University of Chicago. She then became an instructor in biology at California State Teacher's College. From 1921 to 1923, Cady was a lecturer at Stanford University. In 1923, she earned a PhD in entomology from Stanford with her thesis entitled A study of the effects of feeding insect infested cereal food products to animals. From 1924 to 1936, she was a naturalist for the Girl Scouts of the USA. Also, from 1926 to 1929, she was president of the American Nature Study Society.

She married psychologist Vernon Mosher Cady; the couple wrote a book The Way Life Begins: An introduction to Sex Education (1917) which was published by the American Social Hygiene Association. The book sold well and went through several reprints.

Other publications by her include The Girl Scout Leader's Nature Guide (1929).

References 

1873 births
1956 deaths
American entomologists
Stanford University alumni
Stanford University faculty
20th-century American women scientists
Women entomologists
Women science writers
20th-century American scientists
20th-century American women writers